Pseudorucentra is a genus of beetles in the family Cerambycidae, containing the following species:

 Pseudorucentra elongata Breuning, 1948
 Pseudorucentra sybroides Breuning, 1948

References

Apomecynini